Holy Innocents' Episcopal Church is a historic church building at the junction of Main & Craig Street in Como, Mississippi.

The Carpenter Gothic building was constructed in 1873 and added to the National Register of Historic Places in 1987.  It was designed by James B. Cook, an English architect residing in Memphis, Tennessee, at the time this church was built. Construction was done by Andrew Johnson a Swedish architect who went on to design and build 77 structures in the Sardis area. Twenty-one of his homes and buildings are on the National Register of Historic Places.

References

Episcopal church buildings in Mississippi
Churches on the National Register of Historic Places in Mississippi
Carpenter Gothic church buildings in Mississippi
Churches completed in 1873
Churches in Panola County, Mississippi
19th-century Episcopal church buildings
National Register of Historic Places in Panola County, Mississippi